KS Cracovia competed in Ekstraklasa and this season's edition of the Polish Cup. They competed in the UEFA Europa League qualifying phase, when they were eliminated by Malmö FF, following the 0–2 defeat and were awarded as the Polish SuperCup winners, following the 5–4 penalty victory over Legia Warsaw.

They started their Ekstraklasa season with the 5 points deduction for match-fixing during the 2003–04 II liga season.

Players

Competitions

Ekstraklasa

Standings

Matches

Polish Super Cup

Polish Cup

UEFA Europa League

First qualifying round

References

MKS Cracovia seasons
KS Cracovia